Victory is an unincorporated community in the Town of Wheatland in Vernon County, Wisconsin. It is located 4.5 miles north of De Soto and 6.2 miles south of Genoa on the Mississippi River along the Great River Road (WIS 35). It also is served by the BNSF Railway.

History
The Battle of Bad Axe, the final battle of the Black Hawk War of 1832, took place near this community. The community's name commemorates the United States victory.

Notes

Unincorporated communities in Wisconsin
Unincorporated communities in Vernon County, Wisconsin
Wisconsin populated places on the Mississippi River
Former Chicago, Burlington and Quincy Railroad stations